was a Japanese actor who appeared in 253 films in a career spanning 67 years.

Born in Gunma Prefecture, he began acting at the Nikkatsu studio after dropping out of Nihon University and made his film debut in 1942. In 1956 he moved to Toho film company. In a career that spanned 65 years, he appeared in over 250 films, most famously in the "Company President" (Shachō) comedy films made at Toho, where he worked alongside Hisaya Morishige, Daisuke Katō, Norihei Miki, and others. There he helped define the popular image of the postwar salaryman. He also won many awards for his acting, including best actor awards at the Mainichi Film Awards for The Naked General in 1958 (where he played Kiyoshi Yamashita), for Kuroi gashū in 1960, and for The Elegant Life of Mr Everyman in 1963. Kobayashi appeared in films made by such notable directors as Akira Kurosawa, Yasujirō Ozu, Mikio Naruse, and Kihachi Okamoto. He continued to give powerful performances after largely moving to television in the late 1960s.

He also portrayed the voice of the "Shirō Nishi"  in the original Japanese version of the Studio Ghibli anime film Whisper of the Heart in 1995.

He died on 16 September 2010 of heart failure at the age of 86.

Selected filmography

Film

The Rainbow Man (1949) - Ryosuke Akashi
Husband and Wife (1953)
Night School (1956)
Shūu (1956)
 (1958)
 (1958)
 (1960)
The End of Summer (1961)
Burari Bura-bura Monogatari (1962)
The Elegant Life of Mr Everyman (1963)
Sanjuro (1962)
The Sword (1964)
Samurai Assassin (1965)
Japan's Longest Day (1967)
Shinsengumi: Assassins of Honor (1969)
The Militarists (1970), Hideki Tojo
Bakumatsu (1970)
Battle of Okinawa (1971)
 Submersion of Japan (1973)
Tora-san, the Intellectual (1975)
Mount Hakkoda (1977) – Tsumura
Imperial Navy (1981) – Isoroku Yamamoto
Okinawan Boys (1983)
The Return of Godzilla (1984)
Tree Without Leaves (1986)
A Taxing Woman (1987)
Whisper of the Heart (1995) – Shirō Nishi (voice)
Vengeance for Sale (2002)
Koi Suru Kanojo, Nishi e (2008)
Hoshino Kunikara Magofutari (2009) Genichi Kuwano(Final film role)

Television
Katsu Kaishū (1975, Taiga drama) - Tadahiro Okubo
Kaze to Kumo to Niji to (1975, Taiga drama) - Taira no Yoshimasa
Edo no Kaze (1975~1981, Edo series) - Magobei Hayashida
Edo no Uzu (1978, Edo series) - Hanbei Karaki
Edo no Gekitou (1979, Edo series) - Chobei Hanasaka
Tokugawa Ieyasu (1983, Taiga drama) - Taigen Sessai
Haru no Hatō (1985, Taiga drama) - Fukuzawa Yukichi
Muta Kenji Jikenfailu (1983-2007) - Ichiro Muta
Haikei Chichiuesama (2007) -Seisiro Kumazawa

Dubbing
Lady and the Tramp – Tramp

Honours
Medal with Purple Ribbon (1985)
Order of the Rising Sun, 4th Class, Gold Rays with Rosette (1994)

References

External links
 
 

Japanese male film actors
People from Gunma Prefecture
1923 births
2010 deaths
Nihon University alumni
20th-century Japanese male actors
21st-century Japanese male actors
Recipients of the Medal with Purple Ribbon
Recipients of the Order of the Rising Sun, 4th class